Ned Charles Goldreyer is a television writer, producer, and comedian who lives in Los Angeles.

Career
He began his career as a freelance writer for Politically Incorrect and went on to join the staffs of Late Night with Conan O'Brien, The Simpsons, Dilbert, Grounded for Life, Twins, Lewis Black's Root of All Evil, Jonas, and Totally Biased with W. Kamau Bell.

Filmography
Writer:
Late Night with Conan O'Brien (9 episodes, 1995–1996)
The Simpsons (2 episodes, 1997–1998, also story editor from 1996-1998)
"Lisa the Simpson" (1998) 
"Treehouse of Horror VIII" -- "Easy Bake Coven" (1997)
House Rules (1998)
Dilbert (9 episodes, 1999–2000)
2000 MTV Movie Awards (2000)
Grounded for Life (13 episodes, 2001–2005)
Twins (2005) 
2007 MTV Movie Awards (2007)
Spike Guys Choice (2008)
Lewis Black's Root of All Evil (10 episodes, 2008)
Back at the Barnyard (1 episode, 2009)
Jonas (1 and 1/2 episodes, 2010)
Totally Biased with W. Kamau Bell (2012-2013)
Hollywood Puppet Show (10 episodes, 2018)

Producer:
House Rules (1998)
Dilbert (9 episodes, 1999–2000)
Grounded for Life (91 episodes, 2001–2005)
Twins (2005)
Jonas (2010)

Awards & nominations
 1996, nominated for an Emmy Award for 'Outstanding Individual Achievement in Writing for a Variety or Music Program'  for Late Night with Conan O'Brien 
 1997, won a WGA Award for 'Comedy/Variety (Including Talk) - Series'  for Late Night with Conan O'Brien

References

External links

American male comedians
21st-century American comedians
American television producers
Living people
American television writers
American male television writers
Year of birth missing (living people)